The McCallum Medal (officially called the F. J. McCallum Medal) was an Australian rules football honour awarded from 1947 to 2008 to the fairest and most brilliant player in the South Australian National Football League (SANFL) U/17 competition, as judged by field umpires.  It was named after Frederick John McCallum, League life member and past Secretary of the Norwood Football Club.  From 1939-1941 the award was known as the O'Halloran Medal, named after Thomas Shuldham O'Halloran KC, a former chairman of the League.

Winners

O'Halloran Medal

McCallum Medal

References 

Australian rules football awards
South Australian National Football League
Awards established in 1947
Awards disestablished in 2008